Severn Trent plc is a water company based in Coventry, England. It supplies 4.6 million households and business across the Midlands and Wales.

It is traded on the London Stock Exchange and a constituent of the FTSE 100 Index. Severn Trent, the trading name owned by the company, applies to a group of companies operating across the United Kingdom, United States and mainland Europe, with some involvement in the Middle East. It took its name from the two predecessor River Authorities, which managed the catchment of the Severn and the Trent.

History
The Severn Trent Water Authority was established in 1974. In July 1989, the Severn Trent Water Authority was partially privatised under the Water Act 1989, together with the rest of the water supply and sewage disposal industry in England and Wales, to form Severn Trent Water, with a responsibility to supply freshwater and treat sewage for around 8 million people living in the Midlands of England and also a small area of Wales.

In May 1991, it went on to acquire Biffa, a waste management business. In October 2006, Biffa was de merged from the group Severn Trent, and was subsequently listed separately on the London Stock Exchange. In January 2007, the American side of Severn Trent Laboratories was sold to HIG Capital.

In 1993 the company acquired East Worcester Water plc, a former statutory water company whose area was surrounded by Severn Trent's existing water supply area, and the operations were merged.

In September 2007, the company announced they would be closing its headquarters in Birmingham and relocating to a custom built office complex in the centre of Coventry in the autumn of 2010.

In June 2016, Severn Trent Water and United Utilities formed Water Plus in preparation for the water market deregulation, to provide the retail services for their non household customers, after being granted approval by the Competition & Markets Authority.

In 2017 Severn Trent plc acquired Dee Valley Water, a water-only company with an area adjoining Severn Trent Water's own. In 2018 the areas of the two operating companies were adjusted so that Hafren Dyfrdwy (the new name for the Dee Valley company) took on all Severn Trent Water's water supply and wastewater operations in Wales, and the small area of the former Dee Valley operation within England (an exclave at Chester) became part of Severn Trent Water.

Operations
The main companies in the group are Severn Trent Water, Hafren Dyfrdwy and Severn Trent Services. Severn Trent Laboratories was rebranded as part of Severn Trent Services in 2010, to streamline the company and give it a single worldwide image, rather than a series of separate organisations with different identities. As with all water companies in the United Kingdom, Severn Trent is regulated under the Water Industry Act 1991.

, the company supplies about 4.6 million households and businesses in its area, rising from 3.7 million in 2008. Severn Trent Water has a call centre in Coventry, dealing with operational emergencies and billing enquiries, and two other call centres in Derby and Shrewsbury, which deal solely with billing enquiries. Its head office is the new custom built Severn Trent Centre in Coventry.

Regulation and criticism
In July 2007, the Mythe Water Treatment Works near Tewkesbury became inundated with water from the River Severn during the Summer 2007 United Kingdom floods. The water coming into the plant was contaminated, and this led to the loss of all running water for approximately 150,000 people in Cheltenham, Gloucester and Tewkesbury.

In July 2008, OFWAT confirmed that it had fined Severn Trent Water £35.8 million for deliberately providing false information to Ofwat and for delivering poor service to its customers. In July 2008, the company was fined £2m (reduced from a previous judgement of £4m) for poor information reporting and covering up misleading leakage data.

Despite improvements, according to Ofwat, the percentage of leakages from 2010 to 2011 was the highest in England and Wales, at 27%, representing 0.5 billion litres (500,000 tonnes) per day.

On 11 March 2016, Severn Trent customers in Derbyshire were issued  a "do not use" notice due to high levels of chlorine detected in the water supply, leaving thousands of households without a clean, reliable water supply.

Reservoirs

The company operates a number of reservoirs, many of which are accessible for recreational use. These include:
Carsington Reservoir – River Derwent compensation flow pumped storage facility
Upper Derwent Valley (Derwent, Howden and Ladybower Reservoirs) – Built by the Derwent Valley Water Board to supply the cities of Sheffield, Derby, Nottingham and Leicester
Draycote Water
Foremark Reservoir
Shustoke Reservoir
Tittesworth reservoir
Ogston Reservoir
Linacre Reservoirs (non operational since 1995) 
Severn Trent Water also runs the filtration works at the Elan Valley Reservoirs

See also

Biffa (formerly a subsidiary of Severn Trent, which was de merged)

References

External links
Severn Trent plc official website
Severn Trent Water Homepage
Severn Trent Services Analytical Services, formerly Severn Trent Laboratories

Companies based in Coventry
Renewable resource companies established in 1974
Companies listed on the London Stock Exchange
Former nationalised industries of the United Kingdom
Water companies of England
Water supply in Birmingham, West Midlands